MLP SE (formerly MLP AG, founded as Marschollek, Lautenschläger und Partner GbR) is a German corporation providing financial services, especially personal financial planning advisory. It is based in Wiesloch, Baden-Württemberg and was founded on 1 January 1971 in Heidelberg by Eicke Marschollek and Manfred Lautenschläger.

MLP focuses on providing financial services consulting in the domains of pension provision, asset management and risk management to an upscale group of university graduates and wealthy clients. Most of the mediated insurances consist in life, disability, health and annuity insurances.

Structure

General Information
Financial services like investment trusts, insurance enterprises and banks are afforded cost-effective market access by extern agents, because of the missing maintenance of own distribution networks. For them, MLP is an attractive agent, because it is geared towards the group of university graduates, who have good chances for safe employments and upcoming wealth - MLP sues future customers already at the university. 
In 2013 MLP has around 830,300 clients, served by about 1,998 independent consultants and 1,559 permanent MLP employees as of 2013.

Personnel structure
All the consultants have mostly academical background, mostly in the same branch of study as their future customers. They act independent, but are supported by MLP in getting an own office in one of the agencies and getting the possibility for further education. In 1999 MLP founded the MLP Corporate University, which officiates as the main centre for basic and further education of consultants worked for MLP.
The wage-system based for the most part on commissions and premium outlays. But in the first year the consultants received a small wage of 1,250 EUR per month. That allows that the students do not have to pay for the advisory services.

Shareholders

History

Beginning
As the insurance broker Eicke Marschollek and the graduate of law Manfred Lautenschläger founded MLP on 1 January 1971 in Heidelberg, the business idea was from the outset to specialize on young graduates, especially on students of law. This specialization charged a market gap and they rapidly enlarged the target group on other graduates like budding medical practitioners.

Way to the flotation
In 1972 MLP transformed from a GbR in a KG. In 1974 the success allowed, beside the transformation in a GmbH, the opening of agencies in Wiesbaden, Bonn and Düsseldorf.
After adding engineers and economics to their target group, the first step for the flotation on 15 June 1988 was placed 1984 in transforming MLP to an AG. From this time MLP grew quickly and in 1997 MLP was represented in the MDAX. The corporate headquarters move in 2001 from Heidelberg to Wiesloch and on 30 July 2001 MLP was part of the DAX as one of the 30 biggest publicly traded companies in Germany till 2003.

Abroad activities
The abroad activities started 1995 in Austria. In 1998 followed dedications of agencies in Switzerland and 2000 in the Netherlands. A year later, MLP expanded to Great Britain and in 2002 to Spain. But in the course of consolidation in 2003, MLP has concentrated its activities again on Germany and in 2007 MLP closed its agencies in Spain and Great Britain. In 2008 the closing of agencies in Austria and in the Netherlands followed.

References

External links
 

Financial services companies of Germany
Companies based in Wiesloch